The Carolina Maneuvers were a series of United States Army exercises held around Southern North Carolina and Northern South Carolina in 1941. The exercises, which involved some 350,000 troops, was designed to evaluate United States training, logistics, doctrine, and commanders.

References

External links
 THE U.S. ARMY GHQ MANEUVERS OF 1941 

History of North Carolina
History of South Carolina
Military exercises involving the United States
Military in North Carolina
Military in South Carolina
United States home front during World War II
1941 in North Carolina
1941 in military history
1941 in South Carolina